Great Smoky Mountains Railroad 1702 is an S160 class 2-8-0 "Consolidation" type steam locomotive built in September 1942 by the Baldwin Locomotive Works in Philadelphia, Pennsylvania, originally for the U.S. Army Transportation Corps during World War II. After the war ended, the No. 1702 locomotive worked on three different railroads in Arkansas and Nebraska.

In late 1991, the No. 1702 locomotive was purchased by the Great Smoky Mountains Railroad (GSMR) in Bryson City, North Carolina, where it hauled tourist train excursions on the half of the former Southern Railway Murphy Branch, which spans  of track between Dillsboro and Nantahala, North Carolina. In 2005, it went out of service due to firebox issues but was later restored back to operating condition and returned to service in 2016. No. 1702 is currently one of twenty-six S160 steam locomotives preserved in the United States and abroad.

History

No. 1702 is an S160 steam locomotive built in September 1942 by the Baldwin Locomotive Works in Philadelphia, Pennsylvania, originally for the U.S. Army Transportation Corps, where it was stationed for training purposes at the Fort Bragg military base in Fayetteville, North Carolina during World War II. In 1946, a year after the war ended, the No. 1702 locomotive was sold to the Warren and Saline River Railroad (WSR) in Warren, Arkansas, where it was assigned to haul lumber trains. Additionally, its firebox was modified to burn fuel oil as opposed to coal.

Afterwards, the No. 1702 locomotive served tourist operations on the RERX. In 1985, it was sold again to the Fremont and Elkhorn Valley Railroad (FEVR) in Fremont, Nebraska, where the No. 1702 locomotive ran tourist trains on the former Chicago and North Western line between Fremont and Hooper, Nebraska.

In late 1991, the No. 1702 locomotive was purchased by the Great Smoky Mountains Railroad (GSMR) in Bryson City, North Carolina, where it was significantly altered with a taller smokestack, a larger sand dome, and a wider cab to resemble a more typical American steam locomotive. Afterwards, in 1992, the GSMR operated the No. 1702 locomotive with the Nantahala Gorge and Tuckasegee River tourist excursions on the half of the former Southern Railway Murphy Branch, which spans  of track between Dillsboro and Nantahala, North Carolina.

In 2005, the No. 1702 locomotive was sidelined due to firebox issues and became disassembled outside the GSMR's workshop area in Dillsboro, North Carolina, exposed to the elements. In April 2012, the GSMR made an agreement with the Swain County of North Carolina, who donated $700,000 to construct a new steam locomotive workshop for the restoration of No. 1702 and installing a new turntable in Bryson City for the locomotive to be turned around. Afterwards, the restoration work of No. 1702 began in May 2014 and completed on July 21, 2016 with the locomotive beginning its inaugural excursion run five days later.

Appearances in media
No. 1702 made its first cameo appearance in the 1966 film This Property Is Condemned.
In 1972, No. 1702 made its second cameo appearance in the film Boxcar Bertha.

See also
Alaska Railroad 557
Southern Railway 630
Southern Railway 722
Tennessee Valley Railroad 610

Notes

References

Bibliography

External links

Great Smoky Mountains Railroad - official website

2-8-0 locomotives
Baldwin locomotives
Individual locomotives of the United States
Preserved steam locomotives of North Carolina
Railway locomotives introduced in 1942
Standard gauge locomotives of the United States
Steam locomotives of the United States
United States Army locomotives
USATC S160 Class